Henry Lovett (3 March 1856 – 20 May 1937) was an Australian cricketer. He played one first-class match for Tasmania in 1877.

See also
 List of Tasmanian representative cricketers

References

External links
 

1856 births
1937 deaths
Australian cricketers
Tasmania cricketers
Cricketers from Hobart